WBC Spartak Noginsk is a Russian women's basketball club from Noginsk, Moscow Oblast founded in 1949. During the Soviet era it was the women's basketball section of Spartak Moscow. The team enjoyed its golden era between 1977 and 1982, winning three Ronchetti Cups and one Soviet Championship. It played one further Ronchetti Cup final in 1983, and it was the championship's runner-up in seven occasions between 1968 and 1982, second to Daugava Riga.

Following the collapse of the Soviet Union the team was relocated from Moscow to nearby Podolsk and changed its name, competing in the new Russian Premier League as Concern Podolsk. In 1997 it settled in Noginsk, changing its name to Spartakademklub, which was subsequently shortened to Spartak. Since 2009 it has been a regular of the FIBA Eurocup.

Titles
 Ronchetti Cup
 1977, 1981, 1982
 Soviet Championship
 1978

References

Spartak Noginsk
Spartak Noginsk
Basketball Women
Basketball teams established in 1949